Protostropharia alcis is a species of coprophilous agaric fungus in the family Strophariaceae. It was originally described by Finnish mycologist Ilkka Kytövuori in 1999, as one of six species in the "Stropharia semiglobata" group in northwestern Europe. The fungus produces fruit bodies on moose [known in Europe as European elk] dung. In 2013, the fungus named after Alces alces was transferred by Redhead et al. to Protostropharia, a genus circumscribed to contain Stropharia species characterized by the formation of astrocystidia rather than acanthocytes on their mycelium. In addition to Europe, the species has also been recorded in Brazil. The variety austrobrasiliensis was described from Rio Grande do Sul in 2008, where it grows on cow dung, or dung-enriched soil.

References

External links

Fungi described in 1999
Fungi of Europe
Fungi of Brazil
Strophariaceae